Tommy Ternemar, born 1947, is a Swedish social democratic politician who was member of the Riksdag from 2002 to 2010.

References
Tommy Ternemar (S)

1947 births
Living people
Members of the Riksdag from the Social Democrats
Members of the Riksdag 2002–2006
Place of birth missing (living people)
Date of birth missing (living people)
Members of the Riksdag 2006–2010